Walter Benjamin "Jogger" Elcock (December 6, 1888 – June 10, 1964) was an American football player, coach, and referee.  He played college football at Dartmouth College as a tackle from 1909 to 1911.  Elcock served as the head football coach at Washington and Lee University from 1914 to 1916 and at Oglethorpe University from 1920 to 1921. He was also the head coach of the 1917 Camp Gordon football team. Elcock's 1914 Washington and Lee team went undefeated and outscored opponents 324 to 12.  

Elcock was a native of Dorchester, Massachusetts.  He graduated from Dartmouth in 1912 and served as an assistant football coach at his alma mater under Frank Cavanaugh in 1913.

Head coaching record

References

External links
 

1888 births
1964 deaths
American football tackles
College football officials
Camp Gordon football coaches
Dartmouth Big Green football coaches
Dartmouth Big Green football players
Oglethorpe Stormy Petrels football coaches
Washington and Lee Generals football coaches
Sportspeople from Boston
Players of American football from Boston